Dolores Jiménez may refer to:

 Dolores Jiménez Hernández (born 1955), Mexican diplomat
 Dolores Jiménez y Muro (1848–1925), Mexican schoolteacher and revolutionary